Gliese 880 is a small red dwarf star in the northern constellation of Pegasus that may host an exoplanetary companion. No stellar companions to Gliese 880 have been discovered as of 2020.

Planetary system
In June 2019, a candidate planet was reported in orbit around Gliese 880.

References

M-type main-sequence stars
Hypothetical planetary systems
Pegasus (constellation)
J22563497+1633130
BD+15 4733
0880
216899
113296